Holmdel Dutch Reformed Church is a historic church at 41 Main Street in Holmdel Township, Monmouth County, New Jersey, United States.

The Greek Revival building was constructed in 1838 and added to the National Register of Historic Places in 1980. Today, the church building houses offices for Weichert Realtors.

See also
National Register of Historic Places listings in Monmouth County, New Jersey

References

Churches in Monmouth County, New Jersey
Former Dutch Reformed churches in the United States
Holmdel Township, New Jersey
Churches on the National Register of Historic Places in New Jersey
Reformed Church in America churches in New Jersey
Churches completed in 1838
19th-century Reformed Church in America church buildings
Former churches in New Jersey
Dutch-American culture in New Jersey
National Register of Historic Places in Monmouth County, New Jersey
1838 establishments in New Jersey